Polyclaeis maculatus is a species of true weevil family.

Distribution 
This species can be found in Nubia (Sudan, Ethiopia).

References 

 Catalogue of Life
 Encyclopedia of Life
 Universal Biological Indexer
 Global Species

Entiminae
Beetles described in 1840